FC Barcelona enjoyed a decent season by winning both Copa del Rey and UEFA Cup Winners' Cup. The team extended its increasingly frustrating run without winning the league title to three years, as Real Madrid emerged as league winners. During the season, Ronaldo, a Brazilian youngster was the club's top scorer, netting 47 goals in all competitions. Upon winning both trophies, manager Bobby Robson left the club, eventually signing with PSV Eindhoven after spending a sabbatical year. He was replaced by former Ajax coach Louis Van Gaal. Top scorer Ronaldo would leave the club after this season in a surprise transfer to Inter Milan.

Squad
Squad at end of season

Transfers

Winter

Competitions

La Liga

League table

Results by round

Matches

Goalscorers

Copa del Rey

Eightfinals

Quarterfinals

Semifinals

Final

Goalscorers

Supercopa de España

UEFA Cup Winners' Cup

First round

Eightfinals

Quarterfinals

Semifinals

Final

Friendlies

Statistics

Players statistics

Goalscorers
5.Ronaldo
3.Giovanni
1.Figo
1.Popescu
1.Pizzi
1.Nadal
1.Couto
1.Guardiola

See also
FC Barcelona
1996–97 UEFA Cup Winners' Cup
1996–97 La Liga
1996–97 Copa del Rey
1996 Supercopa de España

References

External links
  Official Site
 FCBarcelonaweb.co.uk English Speaking FC Barcelona Supporters
 ESPNsoccernet: Barcelona Team Page 
 FC Barcelona (Spain) profile
 uefa.com - UEFA Champions League
 Web Oficial de la Liga de Fútbol Profesional
 
 

FC Barcelona seasons
Barcelona
UEFA Cup Winners' Cup-winning seasons